The 1957 NCAA Wrestling Championships were the 27th NCAA Wrestling Championships to be held. University of Pittsburgh in Pittsburgh, Pennsylvania hosted the tournament at Fitzgerald Field House.

Oklahoma took home the team championship with 73 points and having two individual champions.

Dan Hodge of Oklahoma was named the Most Outstanding Wrestler.

Team results

Individual finals

References 

NCAA Division I Wrestling Championship
NCAA
Wrestling competitions in the United States
NCAA Wrestling Championships
NCAA Wrestling Championships
NCAA Wrestling Championships